The Ba Xuyen is a breed of domestic pig from South Vietnam, specifically the Mekong Delta. It is a spotted black and white pig with white feet. It was bred from a cross between a Berkshire and a Boxu from 1932 to 1956.

Description
The average size of the breed is 100 kilograms by the time they reach one year old, having a "backfat thickness of 42 mm." When breeding, around 8 piglets are born in every litter.
Its skin color consists of black patches on white to pinkish skin.
Its teeth are coated with enamel, which is similar to human teeth.

See also 
 List of pig breeds
 Vietnamese Pot-bellied

References

External links 
 Pigs at livestockoftheworld.com

Pig breeds originating in Vietnam